A mass shooting is a crime in which an attacker kills or injures multiple individuals simultaneously using a firearm. There is a lack of consensus on what constitutes a mass shooting, but most definitions include a minimum of three or four victims of gun violence, not including the shooter, in a short period. Definitions of mass shootings exclude warfare and sometimes exclude instances of gang violence, armed robberies, and familicides.

In the United States, the Investigative Assistance for Violent Crimes Act of 2012 defines mass killings as three or more killings in a single incident. A Congressional Research Service report from 2013 specifies four or more killings on indiscriminate victims while excluding violence committed as a means to an end, such as robbery or terrorism. Media outlets such as CNN and some crime violence research groups such as the Gun Violence Archive define mass shootings as involving "two or more shot (injured or killed) in a single incident, at the same general time and location, not including the shooter". Mother Jones defines mass shootings as indiscriminate rampages killing three or more individuals excluding the perpetrator, and excluding gang violence and armed robbery. An Australian study from 2006 specifies five individuals killed.

The motive for mass shootings (that occur in public locations) is usually that they are committed by deeply disgruntled individuals who are seeking revenge for failures in school, career, romance, or life in general or who are seeking fame or attention with at least 16 mass shooters since Columbine citing fame or notoriety as a motive. Fame seekers average more than double the body counts, and many articulated a desire to surpass "past records".

Definitions 

There are a variety of definitions of a mass shooting:
 A crowdsourced data site cited by CNN, MSNBC, The New York Times, The Washington Post, The Economist, the BBC, etc., Mass Shooting Tracker, defines a mass shooting as any incident in which four or more people are shot, whether injured or killed.
 CBS defines a mass shooting as an event involving the shooting (not necessarily resulting in death) of five or more people (sometimes four) with no cooling-off period.
 Mother Jones defines a mass shooting as an indiscriminate rampage in a public place, resulting in three or more victims killed by the attacker, excluding gang violence, armed robbery, and attacks by unidentified perpetrators.
 Crime violence research group Gun Violence Archive, whose research is used by major American media outlets, defines a mass shooting as having a "minimum of four victims shot, either injured or killed, not including any shooter who may also have been killed or injured in the incident," differentiating between a mass shooting and mass murder and not counting shooters as victims.

There are also different definitions of the term mass killing:
 Under U.S. federal law, the Attorney General – on a request from a state – may assist in investigating "mass killings", rather than mass shootings. The term is defined as the murder of four or more people with no cooling-off period but redefined by Congress in 2013 as being the murder of three or more people.
 In "Behind the Bloodshed", a report by USA Today, a mass killing is defined as any incident in which four or more were killed, including familial killings. This definition is also used by the Washington Post.
 According to the Investigative Assistance for Violent Crimes Act of 2012, signed into law in January 2013, a mass killing is defined as a killing with at least three deaths, excluding the perpetrator.

The lack of a single definition can lead to alarmism in the news media, with some reports conflating categories of different crimes.

An act of mass shooting is typically defined as terrorist when it "appears to have been intended" to intimidate or to coerce people; although a mass shooting is not necessarily an act of terrorism solely by itself.

By continent and region

Africa
Mass shootings have occurred on the African continent, including the 1927 shooting in South Africa perpetrated by Stephanus Swart, the 2016 Grand Bassam attack in Côte d'Ivoire/Ivory Coast, and the 1994 Kampala wedding massacre in Kampala, Uganda. Whilst incidents of mass violence resulting from terrorism and ethnic conflict have occurred on the continent, "mass shootings" as generally understood are rare in Africa.

Egypt
Various shootings include both the 1997 Luxor massacre and the 2013 Meet al-Attar shooting in Egypt.

Kenya
On 2 April 2015, armed terrorists stormed a public university in the North Eastern part of the country and killed 148 people.

Asia 
Several mass shootings have occurred in Asia, including the 1878 Hyderabad shooting and 1983 Pashupatinath Temple shooting in India, the 1938 Tsuyama massacre in Japan, the 1948 Babrra massacre in Pakistan, the 2014 Peshawar school massacre killing 149 people, the 1993 Chongqing shooting and the 1994 Tian Mingjian incident in China, as well as the 2001 Nepalese royal massacre.

India 
The Jallianwala Bagh massacre took place on 13 April 1919, when an estimated 3791500 Indian protesters were killed by the British Army, and an additional 1,200 were injured.

Israel 

Notable mass shootings in Israel, include the 1972 Lod Airport Massacre, which killed 26 and injured 80, the 2002 Bat Mitzvah massacre in Hadera, Mercaz HaRav Massacre in 2008, the 2014 Jerusalem synagogue attack in Jerusalem and the June 2016 Tel Aviv shooting at the popular Sarona centre complex in Tel Aviv.

There have been two mass shootings by Jews in Israel. Ami Popper was convicted of murdering seven Palestinian men in a mass shooting carried out in 1990. In 1994, terrorist Baruch Goldstein murdered 29 Muslims and injured a further 125 in Hebron during the Cave of the Patriarchs massacre.

Japan 
Japan has as few as two gun-related homicides per year. These numbers include all homicides in the country, not just mass shootings. Japan has had several mass shootings, including the Tsuyama massacre, 2007 Sasebo shooting, and the 2010 Habikino shooting.

South Korea 
Mass shootings are extremely rare in South Korea. The deadliest mass shooting was committed by Woo Bum-kon in 1982, leaving 56 dead. For many years, it was the deadliest mass shooting in modern history, until the 2011 Norway attacks surpassed it.

Thailand 

A mass shooting occurred near and in Nakhon Ratchasima, Thailand, colloquially known as Korat, between 8 and 9 February 2020. A soldier of the Royal Thai Police killed 30 people and wounded 58 others before he was eventually shot and killed.

On 6 October 2022, thirty-eight people, 24 of which were children, were killed in a shooting and stabbing spree by former police officer Panya Kamrab. The main target was a Child Care Centre in Nong Bua Lambhu Province. The perpetrator then killed both his wife and son at his own home.

Europe 

There have been many mass shootings in Europe. The deadliest mass shooting by a lone individual in modern history occurred in Europe with the 2011 Norway attacks in Norway, in which 77 people died. Of them 67 died of gunshot wounds. Eight other victims were killed by a bomb and two indirectly.

Soviet Union/Russia

North America

Canada 

Notable mass shootings in Canada include the 1989 École Polytechnique massacre (which led to stronger gun control in Canada), the 1992 Concordia University massacre, the 2006 Dawson College shooting in Montreal, the 2012 Danzig Street shooting, the 2014 Edmonton shooting in Edmonton, the 2017 Quebec City mosque shooting in Quebec City, the 2018 Toronto shooting, and the 2020 Nova Scotia attacks. Following the attacks in Nova Scotia, collectively considered to be the deadliest mass shooting in Canadian history, Prime Minister Justin Trudeau banned the use, sale, purchase, and import of AR-15sthe semi-automatic rifle used in the shooting and many other shootings in the United States.

Mexico
Notable mass shootings in Mexico include the 2010 Chihuahua shootings in Chihuahua.

United States 

The United States has had the most mass shootings of any country. In a 2016 study published by criminologist Adam Lankford, it was estimated that 31 percent of all public mass shooters from 1966 to 2012 attacked in the United States, although the U.S. had less than five percent of the world's population. The study concludes that "The United States and other nations with high firearm ownership rates may be particularly susceptible to future public mass shootings, even if they are relatively peaceful or mentally healthy according to other national indicators."

Criminologist Gary Kleck criticized Lankford's findings, stating the study merely shows a proportional relationship but fails to prove that gun ownership causes mass shootings. The backlash from economist and gun rights advocate John Lott also raised objections to Lankford's methodology and refusal to share his data. He speculated that Lankford had overlooked a significant number of mass shootings outside the U.S., which if accounted for would adjust the nation's share closer to 2.88 percent; slightly below the world average. Lankford has since followed up on his research, publishing his data and clarifying that the United States from 1998 to 2012 did have more than six times its global share of public mass shooters who attacked alone, which is almost always the case with mass shooters. Using the data from Lott and Moody's 2019 study of mass shootings, Lankford explains that "41 of all 138 public mass shootings by single perpetrators worldwide were committed in the United States. That represents 29.7 percent. Because America had in those years approximately 4.5 percent of the world's population (according to Lott and Moody's calculations), this indicates that based on their data, the United States had more than six times its global share of public mass shooters who attacked alone (29.7/4.5 = 6.6). In a subsequent study, Lankford criticized Lott and Moody for including "attacks by terrorist organizations, genocidal militias, armed rebel groups, and paramilitary fighters" in their data and suggested they "misrepresent approximately 1,000 foreign cases from their own dataset" in other ways.

Mass shootings have also been observed to be followed by an increase in the purchase of weapons but this does not seem to create an increased feeling of needing guns in either gun owners or non-owners.

Even though the global COVID-19 pandemic reduced public gatherings from March 2020 onward, the number of mass shootings increased significantly over that period. It "even doubled in July 2020 compared to a year earlier". The 2022 Buffalo shooting perpetrator, who killed ten people, said he was radicalized during the COVID-19 pandemic.

South America

Argentina
Notable mass shootings in Argentina include the 2004 Carmen de Patagones school shooting in Carmen de Patagones.

Brazil

Notable mass shootings in Brazil include the 2011 Realengo massacre in Rio de Janeiro and the Suzano school shooting in Suzano.

Oceania

Australia

Notable mass shootings in Australia include the 1987 Hoddle Street massacre in Hoddle Street, Clifton Hill, Melbourne; and the 1996 Port Arthur massacre in Port Arthur, Tasmania. There were thirteen mass shootings with five or more deaths between 1979 and 1996, and three mass shootings involving four or more deaths have occurred since the introduction of new gun laws following the Port Arthur incident.

New Zealand

Notable mass shootings in New Zealand include the 1990 Aramoana massacre in which 14 people were killed (including the perpetrator) in Aramoana and the 2019 Christchurch mosque shootings in Christchurch, which resulted in 51 deaths and is the largest mass shooting in New Zealand history.

Victims and survivors 

After mass shootings, some survivors have written about their experiences and their experiences have been covered by journalists. A survivor of the Knoxville Unitarian Universalist church shooting wrote about his reaction to other mass shooting incidents. The father of a victim in a mass shooting at a movie theater in Aurora, Colorado, wrote about witnessing other mass shootings after the loss of his son. The survivors of the 2011 Norway attacks recounted their experience to GQ magazine. In addition, one paper studied Swedish police officers' reactions to a mass shooting.

Survivors of mass shootings can suffer from post-traumatic stress disorder.

Perpetrators

Sex and ethnicity

United States 

The overwhelming majority of mass shooters in the U.S. are male, with some sources showing males account for 98 percent of mass shooters. According to Sky News, male perpetrators committed 110 out of 114 school shootings (96%) in the period 19822019, compared to homicides in general in the United States, where 85.3 percent of homicides were committed by males.

A study by Statista showed that 65 out of 116 (56%) U.S. mass shootings in a period from 1982 to 2019 involved white shooters. According to a database compiled by Mother Jones magazine, the race of the shooters is approximately proportionate to the overall U.S. population, although Asians are overrepresented and Latinos underrepresented.

Mental health and criminal records  

In a study of 55 mass shooters from Mother Jones' mass shooting database, researchers found that 87.5 percent of perpetrators had misdiagnosed and incorrectly treated or undiagnosed and untreated psychiatric illnesses.

According to a study by The Violence Project, 42 percent of all mass shooters experienced physical or sexual abuse, parental suicide, or were victims of bullying. They also found that 72 percent of perpetrators were suicidal.

In a study of 171 mass shooters who attacked in the United States from 1966 to 2019, researchers Adam Lankford and Rebecca Cowan found that although the vast majority of people with mental illness are not violent, "almost all public mass shooters may have mental health problems." They suggest the frequency of mental health problems among mass shooters is sometimes underestimated because "many perpetrators have never been formally evaluated by a psychiatrist or mental health practitioner...and others deliberately avoid doctors, conceal their mental health problems, or lie about their symptoms due to shame, stigma, or fear of other consequences." However, Lankford and Cowan also emphasize that mental illness is not the sole cause of mass shootings and many other factors play an important role in perpetrators' decisions to attack.

Criminologist James Allen Fox said that most mass murderers do not have a criminal record, or involuntary incarceration at a mental health centre, although an article in The New York Times in December 2015 about fifteen recent mass shootings found that six perpetrators had had run-ins with law enforcement, and six had mental health issues.

Motives 

Mass shootings can be motivated by religious extremism, political ideologies (e.g., neo-Nazism, terrorism, white supremacism), racism, sexual orientation, misogyny, mental illness, and revenge against bullying, among other reasons. Forensic psychologist Stephen Ross cites extreme anger and the notion of working for a causerather than mental illnessas primary explanations. A study by Vanderbilt University researchers found that "fewer than five percent of the 120,000 gun-related killings in the United States between 2001 and 2010 were perpetrated by people diagnosed with mental illness." John Roman of the Urban Institute argues that, while better access to mental health care, restricting high powered weapons, and creating a defensive infrastructure to combat terrorism are constructive, they do not address the greater issue, which is "we have a lot of really angry young men in our country and in the world."

Author Dave Cullen, in his 2009 book Columbine on the 1999 Columbine High School massacre and its perpetrators Eric Harris and Dylan Klebold, described Harris as an "injustice collector." He expanded on the concept in a 2015 New Republic essay on injustice collectors, identifying several notorious killers as fitting the category, including Christopher Dorner, Elliot Rodger, Vester Flanagan, and Andrew Kehoe. Likewise, mass shooting expert and former FBI profiler Mary O'Toole also uses the phrase "injustice collector" in characterizing motives of some mass shooting perpetrators. In relation, criminologist James Alan Fox contends that mass murderers are "enabled by social isolation" and typically experience "years of disappointment and failure that produce a mix of profound hopelessness and deep-seated resentment." Jillian Peterson, an assistant professor of criminology at Hamline University who is participating in the construction of a database on mass shooters, noted that two phenomena surface repeatedly in the statistics: hopelessness and a need for notoriety in life or in death. Notoriety was first suggested as a possible motive and researched by Justin Nutt. Nutt stated in a 2013 article, "those who feel nameless and as though no one will care or remember them when they are gone may feel doing something such as a school shooting will make sure they are remembered and listed in the history books."

In a 2019 op-ed for the Los Angeles Times, Jillian Peterson and James Densley of The Violence Project think tank presented a new, hopeful, framework to understand mass shootings. Based on a study funded by the National Institute of Justice, Peterson and Densley found mass shooters had four things in common: 

 Early childhood trauma and exposure to violence at a young age 
 An identifiable grievance or crisis point 
 Validation for their belief system, have studied past shootings to find inspiration 
 The means to carry out an attack

This new framework highlights the complexity of the pathway to a mass shooting, including how each one can be "socially contagious," but also provides a blueprint to prevent the next mass shooting. Each one of the four themes represents an opportunity for intervention. By reducing access to firearms (means), slowing contagion (validation), training in crisis intervention de-escalation (crisis), and increasing access to affordable mental healthcare (trauma), a mass shooting can be averted.

In considering the frequency of mass shootings in the United States, criminologist Peter Squires says that the individualistic culture in the United States puts the country at greater risk for mass shootings than other countries, noting that "many other countries where gun ownership is high, such as Norway, Finland, Switzerland and Israel...tend to have more tight-knit societies where a strong social bond supports people through crises, and mass killings are fewer." He is an advocate of gun control, but contends there is more to mass shootings than the prevalence of guns. The Italian Marxist academic Franco Berardi argues that the hyper-individualism, social alienation and competitiveness fomented by neoliberal ideology and capitalism creates mass shooters by causing people to "malfunction."

Social science and family structure 

A noteworthy connection has been reported in the U.S. between mass shootings and domestic or family violence, with a current or former intimate partner or family member killed in 76 of 133 cases (57%), and a perpetrator having previously been charged with domestic violence in 21.

Moynihan said that "almost all school shooters come from families where the parents are either divorced or alienated," and Cook argued that "perhaps they wouldn't need more gun control if they had better divorce control."

Responses

Media  

Some people have considered whether media attention revolving around the perpetrators of mass shootings is a factor in sparking further incidents. In response to this, some in law enforcement have decided against naming mass shooting suspects in media-related events to avoid giving them notoriety.

The effects of messages used in the coverage of mass shootings have been studied. Researchers studied the role the coverage plays in shaping attitudes toward persons with serious mental illness and public support for gun control policies.

In 2015, a paper written by a physicist and statistician, Sherry Towers, along with four colleagues was published, which proved that there is indeed mass shooting contagion using mathematical modeling. However, in 2017, Towers said in an interview that she prefers self-regulation to censorship to address this issue, just like years ago major news outlets successfully prevent copycat suicide.

In 2016, the American Psychological Association published a press release, claiming that mass shooting contagion does exist and that news media and social media enthusiasts should withhold the name(s) and face(s) of the victimizer(s) when reporting a mass shooting to deny the fame the shooter(s) want to curb contagion.

Some news media have weighed in on the gun control debate. After the 2015 San Bernardino attack, the New York Daily News front-page headline "God isn't fixing this" was accompanied by "images of tweets from leading Republicans who shared their 'thoughts' and 'prayers' for the shooting victims." Since the 2014 Isla Vista killings, satirical news website The Onion has repeatedly republished the story "No Way to Prevent This", Says Only Nation Where This Regularly Happens with minor edits after major mass shootings, to satirise the popular consensus that there is a lack of political power in the United States to prevent mass shootings.

Gun law reform

Responses to mass shootings take a variety of forms, depending on the country and political climate.

Australia
After the 1996 Port Arthur massacre, Australia changed its gun laws.

New Zealand
In the aftermath of the Christchurch mosque shootings, New Zealand announced a ban on almost all semiautomatic military-style weapons.

United Kingdom
As a result of the Hungerford massacre in Hungerford, England, and the Dunblane school massacre in Stirling, Scotland, the United Kingdom enacted tough gun laws and a buyback program to remove specific classes of firearms from private ownership. They included the Firearms Amendment Act 1988, which limited rifles and shotguns; and the 1997 Firearms Amendment Acts, which restricted or made illegal many handguns. There have been two mass shootings since the laws were restricted: the Cumbria shootings in 2010, which killed 13 people, including the perpetrator; and the Plymouth shooting in 2021, which killed six people, including the perpetrator.

United States

In the United States, support for gun law reform varies considerably by political party, with Democrats generally more supportive and Republicans generally more opposed. Some in the U.S. believe that tightening gun laws would prevent future mass shootings. Some politicians in the U.S. introduced legislation to reform the background check system for purchasing a gun. A vast majority of Americans support tighter background checks. "According to a poll by Quinnipiac University in Connecticut, 93 percent of registered voters said they would support universal background checks for all gun buyers."

Others contend that mass shootings should not be the main focus in the gun law reform debate because these shootings account for less than one percent of the U.S. homicide rate and believe that these shootings are hard to stop. They often argue that civilians with concealed guns will be able to stop shootings.

According to British criminologist Peter Squires, who has studied gun violence in different countries, mass shootings may be more due to the "individualistic culture" in the U.S. than its firearm laws.

Leaders 

As of June 2016, U.S. President Barack Obama had spoken in the aftermath of fourteen mass shootings during his eight-year presidency, repeatedly calling for more gun safety laws in the United States. After the Charleston church shooting, Obama said, "At some point, we as a country will have to reckon with the fact that this type of mass violence does not happen in other advanced countries. It doesn't happen in other places with this kind of frequency." After the 2015 San Bernardino attack, Obama renewed his call for reforming gun-safety laws and also said that the frequency of mass shootings in the United States has "no parallel in the world." After the Stoneman Douglas High School shooting, the surviving students, teachers, and parents became strong leaders in the effort to ban assault weapon sales and easy accessibility to weapons.

See also  

 :Category:Mass shootings by country
 Active shooter
 Copycat crime
 Domestic terrorism
 Mass murder
 School shooting
 List of manifestos of mass killers

References

External links
 Timeline: Deadliest U.S. mass shootings
 Public Mass Shootings in the United States: Selected Policy Implications Congressional Research Service
 Algoworld: Scientific Ways To Predict Mass Shootings
 Washington Case Revives Debate About 'Contagious' Mass Shootings
 Yes, Mass Shootings Are Occurring More Often. Mother Jones. 21 October 2014.

 
Gun violence
Killings by type
Terrorism tactics
Attacks by method
Mass murder
Rampages